Biocuration is the field of life sciences dedicated to organizing biomedical data, information and knowledge into structured formats, such as spreadsheets, tables and knowledge graphs. The biocuration of biomedical knowledge is made possible by the cooperative work of biocurators, software developers and bioinformaticians and is at the base of the work of biological databases.

Biocuration as a profession 
A biocurator is a professional scientist who curates, collects, annotates, and validates information that is disseminated by biological and model organism databases. It is a new profession, with the first mentions in the scientific literature dating of 2006 in the context of the work in databases like the Immune Epitope Database and Analysis Resource. Biocurators usually are PhD-level with a mix of experiences in wet lab  and computational representations of knowledge (e.g. via ontologies).

The role of a biocurator encompasses quality control of primary biological research data intended for publication, extracting and organizing data from original scientific literature, and describing the data with standard annotation protocols and vocabularies that enable powerful queries and biological database interoperability. Biocurators communicate with researchers to ensure the accuracy of curated information and to foster data exchanges with research laboratories.

Biocurators are present in diverse research environments, but may not self-identify as biocurators. Projects such as ELIXIR (the European life-sciences Infrastructure for biological Information) and GOBLET (Global Organization for Bioinformatics Learning, Education and Training) promote training and support biocuration as a career path.

In 2011, biocuration was already recognized as a profession, but there were no formal degree courses to prepare curators for biological data in a targeted fashion. With the growth of the field, the University of Cambridge and the EMBL-EBI started to jointly offer a Postgraduate Certificate in Biocuration, considered as a step towards recognising biocuration as a discipline on its own. There is a perceived increase in demand of biocuration, and a need for additional biocuration training by graduate programs.

Organizations that employ biocurators, like Clinical Genome Resource (ClinGen), often provide specialized materials and training for biocuration.

Biological knowledgebases 

The role of biocurators is best known among the field of biological knowledgebases. Such databases, like UniProt and PDB rely on professional biocurators to organize information. Among other things, biocurators work to improve the data quality, for example, by merging duplicated entries.

An important part of those knowledgebases are model organisms databases, which rely on biocurators to curate information regarding organisms of particular kinds. Some notable examples of model organism databases are FlyBase, PomBase, and ZFIN, dedicated to curate information about Drosophila, Schizosaccharomyces pombe and zebrafish respectively.

Curation and annotation 
Biocuration is the integration of biological information into on-line databases in a semantically standardized way, using appropriate unique traceable identifiers, and providing necessary metadata including source and provenance.

Ontologies, controlled vocabularies and standard names 

Biocurators commonly employ and take part in the creation and development of shared biomedical ontologies: structured, controlled vocabularies that encompass many biological and medical knowledge domains, such as the Open Biomedical Ontologies. These domains include genomics and proteomics, anatomy, animal and plant development, biochemistry, metabolic pathways, taxonomic classification, and mutant phenotypes. Given the variety of existing ontologies, there are guidelines that orient researchers on how to choose a suitable one.

The Unified Medical Language System is one such systems that integrates and distributes millions of terms used in the life sciences domain.

Biocurators enforce the consistent use of gene nomenclature guidelines and participate in the genetic nomenclature committees of various model organisms, often in collaboration with the HUGO Gene Nomenclature Committee (HGNC). They also enforce other nomenclature guidelines like those provided by the Nomenclature Committee of the International Union of Biochemistry and Molecular Biology (IUBMB), one example of which is the Enzyme Commission EC number.

More generally, the use of persistent identifiers is praised by the community, so to improve clarity and facilitate knowledge

DNA annotation 

In genome annotation for example, the identifiers defined by the ontologists and consortia are used to describe parts of the genome. For example, the gene ontology (GO) curates terms for biological processes, which are used to describe what we know about specific genes.

Text annotation 
As of 2021, life sciences communication is still done primarily via free natural languages, like English or German, which hold a degree of ambiguity and make it hard to connect knowledge. So, besides annotating biological sequences, biocurators also annotate texts, linking words to unique identifiers. This aids in disambiguation, clarifying the meaning intended, and making the texts processable by computers. One application of text annotation is to specify the exact gene a scientist is referring to.

Publicly available text annotations make it possible to biologists to take further advantage of biomedical text.  The Europe PMC has an Application Programming Interface which centralizes text annotations from a variety of sources and make them available in a Graphic User Interface called SciLite. The PubTator Central also provides annotations, but is fully based on computerized text-mining and does not provide a user interface. There are also programs that allow users to manually annotate the biomedical texts they are interested, such as the ezTag system.

International Society for Biocuration (ISB)

The International Society for Biocuration (ISB) is a non-profit organisation "promotes the field of biocuration and provides a forum for information exchange through meetings and workshops." It has grown from the International Biocuration Conferences and founded in early 2009.

The ISB offers the Biocuration Career Award to biocurators in the community: the Biocurator Career Award (given annually) and the ISB Award for Exceptional Contributions to Biocuration (given biannually).

The official journal of the ISB, Database, is a venue specialized in articles about databases and biocuration.

Community curation
Traditionally, biocuration has been done by dedicated experts, which integrate data into databases. Community curation has emerged as a promising approach to improve the dissemination of knowledge from published data and provide a cost-effective way to improve the scalability of biocuration. In some cases, community help is leveraged in  jamborees that introduce domain experts to curation tasks, carried during the event, while others rely on asynchronous contributions of experts and non-experts.

Biological databases

Several biological databases include author contributions in their functional curation strategy to some extent, which may range from associating gene identifiers with publications or free-text, to more structured and detailed annotation of sequences and functional data, outputting curation to the same standards as professional biocurators. Most community curation at Model Organism Databases involves  annotation by original authors of published research (first-pass annotation) to effectively obtain accurate identifiers for objects to be curated, or identify data-types for detailed curation. For example:

 WormBase successfully solicits first-pass annotation from users and has integrated author curation with the micropublication process. WormBase also integrates text-mining to its platform, providing suggestions to community curators.
 FlyBase sends email requests to authors of new publications, inviting them to list the genes and data types described via an online tool and has also mobilized the community to write gene summary paragraphs.

Other databases, such as PomBase, rely on publication authors to submit highly detailed, ontology-based annotations for their publications, and meta-data associated with genome-wide data-sets using controlled vocabularies. A web-based tool Canto;  was developed to facilitate community submissions. Since Canto is freely available, generic and highly configurable, it has been adopted by other projects. Curation is subjected to review by professional curators resulting in high quality in-depth curation of all molecular data-types.

The widely used UniProt knowledgebase has also a community curation mechanism that allows researchers to add information about proteins.

Wiki-style resources
Bio-wikis rely on their communities to provide content and a series of wiki-style resources are available for biocuration. AuthorReward, for example, is an extension to MediaWiki that quantifies researchers' contributions to biology wikis. RiceWiki was an example of a wiki-based database for community curation of rice genes equipped with AuthorReward. CAZypedia is another such wiki for community biocuration of information on carbohydrate-active enzymes (CAZys).

The  WikiProteins/WikiProfessional was a project to semantically organize biological data led by Barend Mons. The 2007 project had direct contributions of Jimmy Wales, Wikipedia co-founder, and took Wikidata as an inspiration. A currently active project that runs on an adaptation of mediawiki software is WikiPathways, which crowdsources information about biological pathways.

Wikipedia 
There is some overlap between the work of biocurators and Wikipedia, with boundaries between scientific databases and Wikipedia becoming increasingly blurred. Databases like Rfam and the Protein Data Bank for example make heavy use of Wikipedia and its editors to curate information. However, most databases offer highly structured data that is searchable in complex combinations, which is usually not possible on Wikipedia, although Wikidata aims at solving this problem to some extent.

The Gene Wiki project used Wikipedia for collaborative curation of thousands of genes and gene products, such as titin and insulin. Several projects also employ Wikipedia as a platform for curation of medical information.

One other way that Wikipedia is used for biocuration is via its list articles. For example, the Comprehensive Antibiotic Resistance Database integrates its assessment of databases about antibiotic resistance to a particular Wikipedia list.

Wikidata 
The Wikimedia knowledge base Wikidata is increasingly being used by the biocuration community as an integrative repository across life sciences. Wikidata is being seen by some as an alternative with better prospects of maintenance and interoperability than smaller independent biological knowledge bases.

Wikidata has been used to curate information on SARS-CoV-2 and the COVID-19 pandemic and by the Gene Wiki project to curate information about genes. Data from biocuration on Wikidata is reused on external resources via SPARQL queries. Some projects use curation via Wikidata as a path to improve life-sciences information on Wikipedia.

Gamified resources 
An approach to involve the crowd in biocuration is via gamified platforms that use game design principles to boost engagement. A few examples are:

 Mark2Cure, a gamified platform for community curation of biomedical abstracts
 Cochrane Crowd, a platform by Cochrane for curation of clinical trials and to categorize and summarize biomedical literature.
CIViC, a portal for annotation of genomic variants related to cancer which tracks scores and keeps leaderboards.
APICURON, a database to credit and acknowledge the work of biocurators, that collects and aggregates biocuration events from third party resources and generates achievements and leaderboards.

Computational text mining for curation

Natural-language processing and text mining technologies can help biocurators to extract of information for manual curation. Text mining can scale curation efforts, supporting the identification of gene names, for example, as well as for partially inferring ontologies. The conversion of unstructured assertions to structured information makes use of techniques like named entity recognition and parsing of dependencies. Text-mining of biomedical concepts faces challenges regarding variations in reporting, and the community is working to increase the machine-readability of articles.

During the COVID-19 pandemic, biomedical text mining was heavily used to cope with the large amount of published scientific research about the topic (over 50.000 articles).

The popular NLP python package SpaCy has a modification for biomedical texts, SciSpaCy, which is maintained by the Allen Institute for AI.

Among the challenges for text-mining applied to biocuration is the difficulty of accessing full texts of biomedical articles due to pay wall, linking the challenges of biocuration to those of the open-access movement.

A complementary approach to biocuration via text mining involves applying optical character recognition to biomedical figures, coupled to automatic annotation algorithms. This has been used to extract gene information from pathway figures, for example.

Suggestions to improve the written text to facilitate annotations range from using controlled natural languages to providing clear association of concepts (such as genes and proteins) with the particular species of interest.

While challenges remain, text-mining is already an integral part of  the workflow of biocuration in several biological knowledgebases.

Biocreative challenges 

The interface between text-mining and biocuration has been propelled up by the BioCreAtIvE (Critical Assessment of Information Extraction systems in Biology) challenges, a series of text-mining  competitions that occurred for the first time in 2004.

See also 
 AgBase
 Biological database
 Digital curation
 International Society for Biocuration
 Model Organism Database
 OBO Foundry

References

External links 

 International Society for Biocuration
 Biocreative
 Online course on biocuration at EMBL-EBI

Biological databases